Ninja Reflex is a video game developed by Sanzaru Games, and co-published by Nunchuck Games and Electronic Arts. It was released for Wii and Nintendo DS on March 4, 2008 in North America and March 14, 2008 in Europe. It was also released for the Steam service on March 21, 2008.

Ninja Reflex is a party game, capitalizing on the popularity of games that take advantage of the unique Nintendo Wii Remote motions seen in other titles including WarioWare: Smooth Moves, Mario Party 8, and Wii Sports. The objective of Ninja Reflex is to test players' reflexes and reaction times and challenge friends in head-to-head competition.

Reception 

G4 gave the game a review score of 2 out of 5 stars giving praise to the graphics and the game’s animation although giving criticism for the game having only six mini games and found the game to be frustrating due to the game having difficulty reading the movements of the Wii Remote.

Upon release, Ninja Reflex garnered mixed reviews. Common criticisms include the short game play for the $40 price point, with one reviewer citing similar downloadable content from Xbox Live Arcade and Virtual Console going for $20.

References

External links
 

2008 video games
Electronic Arts games
Japan in non-Japanese culture
Video games about ninja
Nintendo DS games
Party video games
Wii games
Windows games
Video games developed in the United States